Kaber is a civil parish in the Eden District, Cumbria, England.  It contains ten listed buildings that are recorded in the National Heritage List for England.  All the listed buildings are designated at Grade II, the lowest of the three grades, which is applied to "buildings of national importance and special interest".  The parish contains the village of Kaber and the surrounding countryside.  All but one of the listed buildings are in the village, and are associated with two buildings, Nelson House and The Buildings Farmhouse.  The other listed building is a farmhouse and barn in the countryside.


Buildings

References

Citations

Sources

Lists of listed buildings in Cumbria